Arjan Kripal Singh (born 13 February 1969), is an Indian cricketer. He is a right-handed batsman and a right-arm medium-pace bowler. He hails from a family of cricketers with his grandfather A. G. Ram Singh playing in two unofficial Test matches, his father A. G. Kripal Singh (14 Test matches) and uncle A. G. Milkha Singh (4 Test matches) representing India in Test cricket. Another uncle A.G. Satwender Singh played first class cricket for Madras cricket team and Tamil Nadu cricket team. His brother Swaran Kripal Singh played in domestic cricket briefly. His grandfather hailed from Amritsar, Punjab (India) who settled down in Madras and played for the local team. All members of the family played for the local team only.

Arjan Kripal Singh was selected for the inaugural World U-19 Cup in 1988 in Australia. He captained the side for one game in place of M. Senthilnathan. Arjan Singh made his debut in Ranji Trophy domestic cricket in the 1988/89 season but never achieved his true potential. He never received an opportunity to play International Cricket and disappeared from domestic cricket after the 1994/95 season.

Arjan Kripal Singh played as a semi-professional guest in the Ottawa Valley Cricket Council in Canada during the 92, 96 seasons. He was remarkably successful in the lower echelon B division but was very unlucky in the higher level A division where the consistently high quality of bowling was his undoing. He scored heavily in the B division with 4 centuries in the 92 season and 2 centuries in the 96 season and a brace of fifties. Curiously, he failed to even reach double figures in the A division. In both 92 and 96, his host team, New Edinburgh Cricket Club were league champions, largely due to Arjan's contributions.

External links
 

Indian cricketers
Tamil Nadu cricketers
1969 births
Living people